The Makah Peaks, 511 m (1676 feet), are mountain summits near Neah Bay on the Olympic Peninsula in the US state of Washington.  They are located in Clallam County.

References

Mountains of Clallam County, Washington
Mountains of Washington (state)
Olympic Mountains